Many's The Fine Tale is a 2002 album by Ed Miller.

Track listing
 "Gie the Fiddler a Dram" (Brian McNeill/Ed Miller) - 4:54
 "The Last Trip Home" (Davy Steele) - 3:46
 "The Lads o' the Fair" (Brian McNeill) - 3:40
 "The Band o' Shearers" (trad. Arr. Miller & Brotherton) - 3:32
 "Jock Stewart" (traditional)- 3:08
 "The Wide Rio Grande" (Brian McNeill) - 4:33
 "All We Can Call Oor Ain" (Brian McNeill) - 7:18
 "Spring Song" (Alan Bell) - 3:33
 "Never Tire of the Road" (Andy Irvine) - 5:14
 "Bunclody" (traditional)- 3:20
 "Lassie o' the Morning" (Jack Foley) - 4:25
 "The Wild West Show" (John Watt) - 4:53
 "My Love Is Like a Red Red Rose" (Burns/traditional) - 3:15

2002 albums
Ed Miller (Scottish folk musician) albums